Crepipatella dilatata is a species of sea snail described by Lamarck.  It is a marine gastropod mollusk in the family Calyptraeidae, the slipper snails or slipper limpets, cup-and-saucer snails, and hat snails.

This species can be distinguished from the other species of South American Crepipatella by examination of developing embryos.  The females brood capsules that include both un-cleaving nurse eggs and viable embryos. The embryos consume the nurse eggs and develop into juveniles that crawl away from the capsule at hatching.

Distribution
Crepipatella dilatata has been documented to occur along the coast of Chile and the southern coast of Argentina.  Since this species is morphologically cryptic with the two other South American species of Crepipatella, DNA sequence data or developmental data are necessary to verify the identity of this species and to obtain accurate distribution data.

Crepipatella dilatata has been also been documented along the Northern coast of Spain.

Description 
The maximum recorded shell length is 60 mm.

Habitat 
Minimum recorded depth is 0 m. Maximum recorded depth is 66 m.  This species commonly occurs living of mussels as well as on rocky substrate.

References

 Rochebrune, A.-T. & Mabille, J., 1889 Mission scientifique du Cap Horn. 1882-1883. Mollusques, vol. 6, p. 128 p, 8 pls

External links
 Lamarck [J.-B. M. de. (1822). Histoire naturelle des animaux sans vertèbres. Tome sixième, 2me partie. Paris: published by the Author, 232 pp]
 Katsanevakis, S.; Bogucarskis, K.; Gatto, F.; Vandekerkhove, J.; Deriu, I.; Cardoso A.S. (2012). Building the European Alien Species Information Network (EASIN): a novel approach for the exploration of distributed alien species data. BioInvasions Records. 1: 235-245
  Paredes C. & Cardoso F. 2007. La Familia Calyptraeidae en el Perú (Gastropoda: Caenogastropoda). Revista Peruana de Biología, número especial 13(3): 177-184
 Veliz, D.; Winkler, F.M.; Guisados, C.; Collin, R. (2012). A new species of Crepipatella (Gastropoda: Calyptraeidae) from northern Chile. Molluscan Research. 32(3): 145-153
 Aguirre, M. (1993). Type specimens of Quaternary marine gastropods from Argentina. Ameghiniana, 30(1), 23-38
 http://www.aquaticinvasions.net/2009/AI_2009_4_2_Collin_etal.pdf

Calyptraeidae
Gastropods described in 1822